Cordelia Elizabeth Cook  (March 17, 1919 – June 19, 1996) was an American combat nurse in the United States Army Nurse Corps during World War II. She was the first woman in the U.S. Army to receive both the Bronze Star Medal award and the Purple Heart.

Early life 
Cook went by the name "Betty".

Military duty 
Cook attended the Christ Hospital School of Nursing in Cincinnati, Ohio.  She continued her nursing duties in World War II in the Presenzano sector at the Italian front.  She received a Bronze Star Medal award for her service, being the first woman to receive the award.

Footnotes

Bibliography

Further reading 

 
 
 
 Columbus Dispatch newspaper (Columbus, Ohio) - Thursday, June 20, 1996 - obituary, p. 7F

External links
Cordelia Cook; Find-A-Grave.com listing

1919 births
1996 deaths
People from Fort Thomas, Kentucky
Military personnel from Cincinnati
People from Columbus, Ohio
United States Army Nurse Corps officers
Female United States Army nurses in World War II
Kentucky women in health professions